Nick Bertozzi (born May 26, 1970) is an American comic book writer and artist, as well as a commercial illustrator and teacher of cartooning.  His series Rubber Necker from Alternative Comics won the 2003 Harvey Awards for best new talent and best new series.  His project, The Salon (published by St. Martin's Press), examines the creation of cubism in 1907 Paris in the context of a fictional murder mystery.

Early life
Bertozzi grew up on the East Side of Providence, Rhode Island, and in Rehoboth, Massachusetts, and got his BA from the University of Massachusetts Amherst.  He has lived in Madrid, Philadelphia, and New York City.

Career
Bertozzi also illustrated Houdini: The Handcuff King (published by Hyperion), which was written by Jason Lutes. Bertozzi also publishes two webcomics, Persimmon Cup and Pecan Sandy, as part of the ACT-I-VATE comics blog. His illustration clients include Nickelodeon Magazine, Spin, The New York Times, New York Press, Gourmet, Abercrombie & Fitch, and WFMU.

He teaches cartooning at the School of Visual Arts in Manhattan.

Awards 
 2000, Xeric Grant for Boswash (2000)
 2000, Ignatz Award for Promising New Talent
 2002, Emerging Talent of the Year, The Comics Journal
 2003, Harvey Award for Best New Series (Rubber Necker); Harvey Award for Best New Talent

Selected bibliography
Boswash (self-published, 2000) — published through a grant from the Xeric Foundation
The Masochists (Alternative Comics, 2001) 
Rubber Necker 1-4 (Alternative Comics, 2002–2004); 5-6 (self-published, 2013-2015)
The Salon (St. Martin's Press, 2007) 
Houdini: The Handcuff King (Hyperion, 2007) written by Jason Lutes 
Stuffed! (First Second, 2009) written by Glenn Eichler 
 ACT-I-VATE Primer (IDW , 2009)  — contributor
 Lewis & Clark (First Second, 2011) 
Jerusalem: A Family Portrait (First Second, 2013), written by Boaz Yakin 
Diabetes and Me (Hill & Wang, 2013) written by Kim Chaloner 
 Persimmon Cup (self-published, 2014)
Shackleton: Antarctic Odyssey (First Second, 2014) 
 Becoming Andy Warhol (Abrams ComicsArts, 2016), written by Bertozzi and drawn by Pierce Hargan 
 The Good Earth (Simon & Schuster, 2017), by Pearl S. Buck, adapted by Bertozzi

Notes

References

 Nick Bertozzi minibio at Lambiek.net

External links
 
 Le Sketch: mini-comic with Nick Bertozzi's sketches.

1970 births
Living people
Alternative cartoonists
American comics artists
American comics writers
American graphic novelists
American writers of Italian descent
People from New York City
Writers from Providence, Rhode Island
School of Visual Arts faculty
American male novelists
Artists from Providence, Rhode Island
Novelists from New York (state)